Jollpajaja (likely from Quechua qullpa salty, salpeter, qaqa rock, "salpeter rock") is a mountain in the Vilcanota mountain range in the Andes of Peru, about  high. It is located in the Cusco Region, Quispicanchi Province, Marcapata District. It is situated southwest of Vizcachani and north of Yana Orjo. West of Jollpajaja and Yana Orjo, there is a small lake named Mullopunco.

References

Mountains of Cusco Region
Mountains of Peru